Charles Kay Paye (3 October 1886 – 26 June 1966) was an Irish Gaelic footballer who played as a forward for the Cork senior team.

Paye made his first appearance for the team during the delayed 1905 championship and was a regular member of the starting fifteen until the completion of the 1911 championship. During that time he won one All-Ireland medal and two Munster medals.

At club level Paye was a double county championship medalist with Fermoy.

References

1886 births
1966 deaths
Fermoy Gaelic footballers
Cork inter-county Gaelic footballers
Winners of one All-Ireland medal (Gaelic football)